Alan Rawsthorne (2 May 1905 – 24 July 1971) was a British composer. He was born in Haslingden, Lancashire, and is buried in Thaxted churchyard in Essex.

Early years
Alan Rawsthorne was born in Deardengate House, Haslingden, Lancashire,  to Hubert Rawsthorne (1868–1943), a well-off medical doctor, and his wife, Janet Bridge (1877/8–1927). Despite what appears to have been a happy and affectionate family life with his parents and elder sister, Barbara (the only sibling), in beautiful Lancashire countryside, as a boy Rawsthorne suffered from fragile health. Although he did at various times attend schools in Southport, much of Rawsthorne's early education came through private tutoring at home. Despite his childhood aptitude for music and literature, Rawsthorne's parents tried to steer him away from his dreams of becoming a professional musician. As a result, he unsuccessfully tried to take on degree courses at Liverpool University, first in dentistry and then architecture. Concerning dentistry, Rawsthorne is on record as having said "I gave that up, thank God, before getting near anyone's mouth", while his friend Constant Lambert quipped "Mr Rawsthorne assures me that he has given up the practice of dentistry, even as a hobby."

Career
In 1925, Rawsthorne was finally able to enrol at the Royal Manchester College of Music, where his teachers included Frank Merrick for the piano and Carl Fuchs for the cello. In 1927, Rawsthorne's mother died aged just forty-nine. After graduating from the Royal Manchester College of Music around 1930, Rawsthorne spent the next couple of years pursuing his piano training with Egon Petri at Zakopane in Poland, and then briefly also in Berlin.

On his return to England in 1932, Rawsthorne took up a post as pianist and teacher at Dartington Hall in Devon, where he became composer-in-residence for the School of Dance and Mime. In 1934, Rawsthorne left for London to try his fortune as a freelance composer. His first real public success arrived four years later with a performance of his Theme and Variations for Two Violins at the 1938 International Society for Contemporary Music (ISCM) Festival in London. The next year, his large-scale Symphonic Studies for orchestral was performed in Warsaw, again at the ISCM Festival. The first in a line of completely assured orchestral scores, the Symphonic Studies, which can be heard as a concerto for orchestra in all but name, rapidly helped Rawsthorne establish himself as a composer possessing a highly distinctive musical voice.()

Other acclaimed works by Rawsthorne include a viola sonata (1937), two piano concertos (1939, 1951), an oboe concerto (1947), two violin concertos (1948, 1956), a concerto for string orchestra (1949), and the Elegy for guitar (1971), a piece written for and completed by Julian Bream after the composer's death.  Other works include a cello concerto, three acknowledged string quartets among other chamber works, and three symphonies.

Rawsthorne wrote a number of film scores. His best–known work in this field was the music for the 1953 British war film The Cruel Sea,  and his other scores included many popular British films, such as The Captive Heart (1946), School for Secrets (1946), Uncle Silas (1947), Saraband for Dead Lovers (1948), Pandora and the Flying Dutchman (1951), Where No Vultures Fly (1951), West of Zanzibar (1954), The Man Who Never Was (1956) and Floods of Fear (1958).

Family

In 1934 Rawsthorne married his first wife Jessie Hinchcliffe, a violinist in the Philharmonia Orchestra. They separated in 1947 and divorced in 1954. The following year he married Isabel Rawsthorne (née Isabel Nicholas), an artist and model well known in the Paris and Soho art scenes. Her contemporaries included André Derain, Alberto Giacometti, Pablo Picasso and Francis Bacon. Isabel Rawsthorne was the widow of composer Constant Lambert and stepmother to Kit Lambert, manager of the rock group the Who, who died in 1981. Alan Rawsthorne was her third husband; Sefton Delmer (the journalist and member of the Special Operations Executive during the Second World War) was her first husband. Isabel died in 1992.

Compositions

Ballet
Madame Chrysanthème (1955)

Orchestral
 Light Music for Strings (1938)
Symphonic Studies (1938)
Cortèges, Fantasy Overture (1945)
 Concerto for String Orchestra (1949)
 Symphonies
 Symphony No. 1 (1950)
 Symphony No. 2 A Pastoral Symphony (1959)
 Symphony No. 3 (1964)
Improvisations on a Theme by Constant Lambert (1960)
 Music from film The Cruel Sea
 Divertimento for Chamber Orchestra (1962)
 Elegiac Rhapsody for Strings (1963)
Hallé Overture
 Suite from Madame Chrysanthème
 Overture for Farnham
 Prisoners' March – from film The Captive Heart
 Street Corner Overture
 Theme, Variations and Finale
 Triptych for orchestra

Concertante
Clarinet Concerto (1936–37)
Oboe Concerto (1947)
Concertante Pastorale for flute, horn and orchestra (1951)
Cello Concerto (1966)
Violin
Violin Concerto No. 1 (1948)
Violin Concerto No. 2 (1956)
Piano
Piano Concerto No. 1 (1939, revised 1942)
Piano Concerto No. 2 (1951)
Concerto for Two Pianos and Orchestra (1968)

Chamber
Sonatina for Flute, Oboe and Piano (1936)
Concertante for Piano and Violin (1937)
Theme and Variations for Two Violins (1937)
Clarinet Quartet (1948)
Concerto for Ten Instruments (1961)
Piano Trio (1962)
Quintet for Piano, Oboe, Clarinet, Horn & Bassoon (1963)
String Quartets
String Quartet No. 1 (1939)
String Quartet No. 2 (1954)
String Quartet No. 3 (1965)
Piano Quintet (1968)
Suite for Flute, Viola and Harp (1968)

Instrumental
Viola Sonata (1937, revised 1953)
Cello Sonata (1949)
Violin Sonata (1960)
Elegy for Guitar (1971)
Suite for Treble Recorder & Piano

Piano
Ballade in G sharp minor (Dated Christmas 1929)
Bagatelles (1938)
Piano Sonatina (1949)
Four Romantic Pieces (1953)
Ballade (1967)
The Creel: suite for piano duet

Vocal orchestral
Carmen Vitale: choral suite
A Canticle of Man: chamber cantata
The God in a Cave: cantata
Medieval Diptych 962
Practical Cats for speaker and orchestra
Tankas of the Four Seasons

Choral
Canzonet from A Garland for the Queen 
Four Seasonal Songs
Lament for a Sparrow
The Oxen
A Rose for Lidice

Vocal
Three French Nursery Songs
We Three Merry Maids
Two Songs to Words by John Fletcher
Carol
Saraband (with Ernest Irving)
Scena Rustica for soprano and harp
Two Fish

Notes

References

Further reading

External links 
Leicestershire Schools Symphony Orchestra – Photo: Norman Del Mar, Norma Fisher and the composer following a performance of the 2nd Piano Concerto at the Fairfield Hall, Croydon in 1967
 Cello Sonata Reviews
 

1905 births
1971 deaths
20th-century classical composers
English classical composers
British ballet composers
People from Haslingden
English Swedenborgians
Musicians from Lancashire
20th-century English musicians
Alumni of the Royal Manchester College of Music
English male classical composers
20th-century British composers
20th-century British male musicians
20th-century British musicians